Strophodus is an extinct genus of hybodonts known from the Triassic to Cretaceous. It has heavily rounded, durophagous teeth. It has long been confused with Asteracanthus due to the fin spines of the latter being found associated with the teeth of Strophodus. However, both genera can now be reliably be distinguished base on the morphology of both the fin spines and teeth.

Species 
After

 S. reticulatus  Agassiz, 1838 Middle-Late Jurassic (Bathonian–Tithonian) England, France, Germany, Hungary and Switzerland. A similar form S. cf. reticulatus is known from the Middle Triassic of Switzerland
 S. smithwoodwardi (Peyer, 1946) Early Jurassic (Toarcian) Switzerland
 S. dunaii (Szabó & Főzy (2020) Middle Jurassic (Aalenian), Hungary
 S. tenuis Agassiz, 1838 Middle Jurassic (Aalenian-Bathonian) Germany, England
 S. longidens Agassiz, 1838 Middle Jurassic (Bathonian) France
 S. magnus Agassiz, 1838 Middle Jurassic (Bathonian) France, India, England
 S. indicus (Sharma & Singh, 2021) Middle Jurassic (Bathonian), India
 S. jaisalmerensis (Kumar et al., 2022) Middle Jurassic (Bathonian) India
 S. medius (Owen, 1869) Middle Jurassic (Bathonian-Callovian) India, France, England
 S. subreticulatus (Agassiz, 1838) Late Jurassic (Kimmeridigan) Switzerland
 S. udulfensis (Leuzinger et al., 2017) Late Jurassic (Kimmeridigan) Switzerland ?England
 S. tridentinus (Zittel, 1870) Late Jurassic (Tithonian) Italy (possibly a nomen dubium)
 S. rebecae Carrillo-Briceño & Cadena, 2022 Early Cretaceous (Valanginian-Hauterivian), Colombia

Indeterminate remains of Strophodus possibly extend into the Albian stage of the Early Cretaceous. Claimed records of the genus from the Late Cretaceous are  doubtful.

References 

Hybodontiformes
Fossil taxa described in 1838
Taxa named by Louis Agassiz
Ladinian genus first appearances
Hauterivian extinctions
Middle Triassic animals of Europe
Jurassic fish of Europe
Early Cretaceous fish of South America
Cretaceous Colombia
Fossils of Colombia
Jurassic England
Fossils of England
Jurassic France
Fossils of France
Jurassic Germany
Fossils of Germany
Jurassic India
Fossils of India
Jurassic Italy
Fossils of Italy
Triassic Switzerland
Jurassic Switzerland
Fossils of Switzerland